Matthias de Zordo (born 21 February 1988) is a German athlete who was the World Champion in the men's javelin throw in 2011. With a throw of 87.81 metres, he won the silver medal at the 2010 European Athletics Championships in Barcelona.

De Zordo was born in Bad Kreuznach. He became German Champion in July 2010 at the 2010 German Athletics Championships in Braunschweig and again at the 2011 German Athletics Championships in Kassel.

In 2011, he won gold at the World Championships in Daegu with a throw of 86.27 metres. He finished off his 2011 season with a win at the Memorial Van Damme in Brussels with a personal best of 88.36 metres. With his win in Brussels, he also secured the Diamond League trophy for the men's javelin.

Achievements

Seasonal bests by year
2006 - 71.67 
2007 - 78.67 
2008 - 82.51
2009 - 80.15
2010 - 87.81
2011 - 88.36
2012 - 81.62
2013 - 81.49

References

External links 
 
 
 
 
 

1988 births
Living people
People from Bad Kreuznach
German male javelin throwers
German national athletics champions
German people of Italian descent
Athletes (track and field) at the 2012 Summer Olympics
Olympic athletes of Germany
World Athletics Championships medalists
European Athletics Championships medalists
Sportspeople from Rhineland-Palatinate
Diamond League winners
World Athletics Championships winners